Alan Marshal (born Alan M Willey 29 January 1909 – 9 July 1961) was an actor who performed on stage in the United States and in Hollywood films. He was sometimes billed as Alan Marshall or Alan Willey.

Biography

Early life
Born Alan M Willey in Sydney, Australia, he was the son of popular Queensland stage actress Irby (Agnes) Marshal and English actor-producer Leonard Willey. The family left Australia in mid 1914, when he was five years old.

Willey and Marshal appeared in several Australian films made in 1912 – including The Strangler's Grip (1912) and The Mystery of the Black Pearl (1912), both directed by Franklyn Barrett.

Irby and Leonard continued their successful careers on the stage in the United States, first in San Francisco then in New York.

Early acting career
Alan reportedly first appeared on Broadway in The Swan (1924), at age 15 as "Alan Willey".

He went on to appear on Broadway as Stephano in The Merchant of Venice (1928), a production that also featured his father Leonard Willey as Antonio. Other Broadway stage productions he performed in include The Game of Love and Death (1929–30), Michael and Mary (1930), and Death Takes a Holiday (1931).

As "Alan Marshal", he had roles on Broadway in Foolscap (1933), Going Gay (1934), While Parents Sleep (1934), Lady Jane (1934), The Bishop Misbehaves (1935) and On Stage (1935).

Film career

According to his son, Kit, Marshal was spotted by a studio scout while performing in a play in New York and was asked to do a screen test for Selznick International Studios.

Selznick cast him in a supporting role in The Garden of Allah (1936) with Charles Boyer and Marlene Dietrich.

Marshal was loaned to MGM where he was in After the Thin Man (1936). That studio liked him and gave him a good part in Night Must Fall (1937).

Marshal was used by MGM for key roles in prestige pictures: Parnell (1937), playing William O'Shea who was cuckolded by Clark Gable and Myrna Loy; and Conquest (1937) with Greta Garbo and Boyer, playing Philippe Antoine d'Ornano.

Walter Wanger borrowed him for I Met My Love Again (1938), billed fourth.

Marshal's first lead role was in a B picture at Republic Films, Invisible Enemy (1938). He went back to support parts for The Road to Reno (1938) at Universal, then was the romantic male lead in Dramatic School (1938) with Luise Rainer at MGM, a big flop.

He played a similar sort of part in Four Girls in White (1939) then was Anna Sten's co star in Exile Express (1939) made at Grand National Pictures.

Marshal had a strong role in 20th Century Fox's The Adventures of Sherlock Holmes (1939) supporting Basil Rathbone and Ida Lupino.

At RKO Marshal had a support part in The Hunchback of Notre Dame (1939) and the lead in a B picture, Married and in Love (1940), directed by John Farrow. He supported Anna Neagle in Irene (1940) at RKO and Loretta Young in He Stayed for Breakfast (1940) at Columbia.

Marshal stayed at Columbia for The Howards of Virginia (1940) with Cary Grant then went back to RKO to play one of Ginger Rogers's suitors in Tom, Dick and Harry (1940), a big hit. He was second billed to Merle Oberon in Lydia (1941). In 1942 Selznick sold many of his contracts to 20th Century Fox including Marshal's.

Marshal was second billed to Irene Dunne in The White Cliffs of Dover (1944) at MGM, a huge hit. He was top billed in Bride by Mistake (1944) with Laraine Day, another box office success. "It's the third time I've been discovered", said Marshall, who was set to star in Claudia (1945).

However Marshal had a nervous breakdown and did not act for a number of years.

Television
Marshall was announced for Three Came Home (1950) but did not appear in the final film. It was reported he withdrew due to illness.

Marshal concentrated on television in the 1950s, appearing in episodes of Lights Out (1950) ("The Dark Corner"), The Clock (1951) ("Last Adventure"), Robert Montgomery Presents (1952) ("Claire Ambler"), and Climax! (1956) ("The Hanging Judge", directed by John Frankenheimer).

Marshal returned to movies with a small role in The Opposite Sex (1956). He was more commonly found on TV, such as in Playhouse 90 (1957, "The Greer Case"), Perry Mason (1958, "The Case of the Terrified Typist"), Buckskin (1958, "The Ghost of Balaclava"), General Electric Theatre (1958, "Battle for a Soul", directed by Ray Milland), Wagon Train (1958, "The Doctor Willoughby Story", with Jane Wyman), The Ann Sothern Show (1958, "The Countess of Bartley"), Alfred Hitchcock Presents (1958, "Murder Me Twice"), Rawhide (1959, "Incident on the Edge of Madness", with Lon Chaney Jr), 77 Sunset Strip (1959)("In Memoriam"), M Squad (1959) ("Ghost Town"), Sugarfoot (1959, "The Vultures"), Bourbon Street Beat (1959, "Invitation to a Murder") and Surfside 6 (1960, "Spinout at Sebrin").

Marshall had a supporting role in House on Haunted Hill (1959) starring Vincent Price and directed by William Castle, and the western Day of the Outlaw (1959).

Filmography

Family

Marshal eloped with socialite Mary Grace Borel in November 1938. The couple had one son, Christopher ("Kit"), who also became an actor. Borel sued for divorce in August 1947. Marshal did not remarry.

Death
Marshal died after suffering a heart attack while appearing in Chicago with Mae West in a production of her play "Sextette" at the Edgewater Beach Playhouse on 9 July 1961. He was 52. He finished the performance but was later found dead in his bed at the Edgewater Beach Hotel. His son Kit was also performing in the show.

His interment was at Forest Lawn Memorial Park Cemetery in Glendale, California.

References

Further reading

External links

 
 
  (alternate billing)
 

1909 births
1961 deaths
Australian expatriate male actors in the United States
Australian male film actors
Australian male stage actors
Australian people of English descent
Male actors from Sydney
Burials at Forest Lawn Memorial Park (Glendale)
20th-century Australian male actors